Manette may refer to:

People:
A. Manette Ansay (born 1964), American author, born in Lapeer, Michigan
Alexandre Manette, character in Charles Dickens' novel, A Tale of Two Cities
Lucie Manette, character in Charles Dickens' novel, A Tale of Two Cities

Location in Washington, USA:
Manette, Washington, Washington is a community in Kitsap County, Washington, United States
Manette Bridge, steel truss bridge that spans the Port Washington Narrows in Bremerton, Washington, USA
Manette Peninsula, headland that is part of the larger Kitsap Peninsula on the eastern flank of the Olympic Peninsula in western Washington, USA

fr:Manette
it:Manette
nl:Manette
vo:Manette